The Juno Award for "Recording Engineer of the Year" has been awarded since 1976, as recognition each year for the best recording engineer in Canada.

Winners

Recording Engineer of the Year (1976 - 1998) 
 1976 - Michel Ethier, Dompierre (album)|Dompierre by François Dompierre
 1977 - Paul Pagé, Are You Ready For Love by Patsy Gallant
 1978 - (tie) Terry Brown, Hope by Klaatu AND David Greene, Big Band Jazz by The Boss Brass
 1979 - Ken Friesen, Let's Keep It That Way by Anne Murray
 1980 - David Greene, Concerto for Contemporary Violin by Paul Hoffert
 1981 - Mike Jones, "Factory"" and "We're OK" by Instructions
 1982 - (tie) Gary Gray, "Attitude" & "For Those Who Think Young"" by Rough Trade AND Keith Stein / Bob Rock, "When It's Over" & "It's Your Life" by Loverboy
 1983 - Bob Rock, No Stranger To Danger by Payolas
 1984 - John Naslen, Stealing Fire by Bruce Cockburn
 1985 - Hayward Parrott, Underworld by The Front
 1986 - Joe Vannelli / Gino Vannelli, Black Cars
 1987 - Gino Vannelli / Joe Vannelli, "Wild Horses" & "Young Lover"
 1989 - Mike Fraser, "Calling America" & "Different Drummer" by Tom Cochrane & Red Rider
 1990 - Kevin Doyle, Alannah Myles
 1991 - Gino Vannelli / Joe Vannelli, "The Time of Day" & "Sunset On LA"
 1992 - Mike Fraser, "Thunderstruck" &  "Moneytalks" by AC/DC
 1993 - Jeff Wolpert / John Whynot, "The Lady of Shallott" by Loreena McKennitt
 1994 - Kevin Doyle, "Old Cape Cod" & "Cry Me a River" by Anne Murray
 1995 - Lenny DeRose, "Lay My Body Down" & "Charms" by The Philosopher Kings
 1996 - Chad Irschick, "O Siem" by Susan Aglukark
 1997 - Paul Northfield, "Another Sunday" by I Mother Earth, "Leave It Alone" by Moist
 1998 - Michael Phillip Wojewoda, "Armstrong and the Guys" & "Our Ambassador" by Spirit of the West

Best Recording Engineer (1999 - 2002) 
 1999 - Kevin Doyle, "Stanstill" by various artists and  "Soul On Soul" by Amy Sky
 2000 - Paul Northfield / Jagori Tanna, "Summertime in the Void" & "When Did You Get Back From Mars?" by I Mother Earth
 2001 - Jeff Wolpert, "Make It Go Away" & "Romantically Helpless" by Holly Cole
 2002 - Randy Staub, "How You Remind Me" & "Too Bad" by Nickelback

Recording Engineer of the Year (2003 - present) 
 2003 - Denis Tougas, "Double Agent" & "Everybody's Got A Story" by Amanda Marshall
 2004 - Mike Haas / Dylan Heming / Jeff Wolpert, "Heat Wave" and "Something Cool" by Holly Cole
 2005 - L. Stu Young, "What Do U Want Me 2 Do?" and "If Eye Was the Man in Ur Life" by Prince
 2006 - Vic Florencia, "Everyday Is a Holiday" and "Melancholy Melody" by Esthero
 2007 - John "Beetle" Bailey, "Rain" by Molly Johnson and "Sisters of Mercy" by Serena Ryder
 2008 - Kevin Churko, Black Rain by Ozzy Osbourne
 2009 - Kevin Churko, "Disappearing" and "The Big Bang" (Simon Collins, U-Catastrophe)
 2010 - Dan Brodbeck, "Apple Of My Eye" and "Be Careful" (Dolores O’Riordan, No Baggage)
 2011 - Kevin Churko, "Let It Die", "Life Won’t Wait" (Ozzy Osbourne, Scream)
 2012 - George Seara, "A Little Bit of Love", Michael Kaeshammer and "Let Go", Laila Biali
 2013 - Kevin Churko / (co-engineer Kane Churko), "Blood" from Blood by In This Moment; "Coming Down" from American Capitalist by Five Finger Death Punch
 2014 - Eric Ratz, "Sweet Mountain River" and "The Lion" from Furiosity by Monster Truck
 2015 - Eric Ratz, "Ghosts" from Ghosts by Big Wreck and "Satellite Hotel" from Black Buffalo by One Bad Son
 2016 - Shawn Everett, "Don't Wanna Fight", "Gimme All Your Love" from Sound & Color by Alabama Shakes
 2017 - Jason Dufour, "Push + Pull", "Beck + Call" from Touch by July Talk
 2018 - Riley Bell, "Get You" by Daniel Caesar feat. Kali Uchis, "We Find Love" by Daniel Caesar
 2019 - Shawn Everett, "Slow Burn", "Space Cowboy" (Kacey Musgraves, Golden Hour)
 2020 - John "Beetle" Bailey - "Dividido" (Alex Cuba feat. Silvana Estrada), "Shotgun" (Monkey House)
 2021 - Serban Ghenea - "Blinding Lights" (The Weeknd); "Positions" (Ariana Grande)
 2022 - Hill Kourkoutis — "Howler" (SATE), "The Drought" (Tania Joy)
2023 - Serban Ghenea — "That's What I Want" (Lil Nas X), "Unholy" (Sam Smith feat. Kim Petras)

References 

Recording Engineer